Indigofera spicata, the creeping indigo or trailing indigo, is a species of flowering plant in the family Fabaceae. It is native to SubSaharan Africa, Madagascar, Mauritius, Réunion, and Yemen, and has been introduced to the southeastern United States, various Caribbean islands, Brazil and other locations in Latin America, various Pacific islands, and New South Wales and Queensland in Australia. It was considered to be a promising forage plant, and then shown to be toxic to nearly all livestock, but it is possible that the experiments were conducted on the similar Indigofera hendecaphylla, leading to some confusion.

Subtaxa
The following varieties are accepted:
Indigofera spicata var. spicata

References

spicata
Flora of West Tropical Africa
Flora of West-Central Tropical Africa
Flora of Northeast Tropical Africa
Flora of East Tropical Africa
Flora of South Tropical Africa
Flora of Southern Africa
Flora of Madagascar
Flora of Mauritius
Flora of Réunion
Flora of Yemen
Plants described in 1775